Sports in Indianapolis include major league franchises, collegiate athletics, and a variety of other club and individual sporting events that have taken place in Indianapolis, Indiana, United States. Indianapolis is the home to 11 professional sports teams. The city is also home to three National Collegiate Athletic Association collegiate teams. Two teams from the four major American leagues, the Indianapolis Colts and Indiana Pacers, are located in Indianapolis.

A number of minor league-level teams also play in the city. The Indiana Fever Women's National Basketball Association (WNBA) started play in 2000, and are under the same ownership as the Pacers NBA team. The Indianapolis Indians are the second oldest Minor League Baseball team, having played in the city since 1902, and are currently members of the Triple-A International League. The Indianapolis AlleyCats were formed in 2012 as one of the founding teams of the American Ultimate Disc League (AUDL). The Indy Eleven soccer team began play in 2014 and are members of the United Soccer League (USL).

Notably, Indianapolis is the headquarters of the National Collegiate Athletic Association (NCAA), the main governing body for U.S. collegiate sports,   the National Federation of State High School Associations, and the Indianapolis 500, one of three legs of the Triple Crown of Motorsport.

Major League teams in Indianapolis

Indianapolis Colts (NFL) 

The Indianapolis Colts are a professional American football based in Indianapolis. The team is part of the South Division of the American Football Conference (AFC) in the National Football League (NFL). The Colts have won five NFL Championships, including two Super Bowl titles. The Colts relocated from Baltimore in 1984, and began their stay in Indianapolis winning 90 of 228 games through the 1997 season, including 5 playoff games. Since Jim Irsay assumed control of the franchise in 1998 after the death of his father Robert Irsay, the team has become the first in league history to win 12 games or more in five consecutive seasons (2003–2007). After their first playoff berth in Indianapolis in 1987, they missed the playoffs 7 consecutive years. In 1995 the Colts made it to their 1st AFC Championship Game since relocating but lost to the Pittsburgh Steelers on a last-second play. In 1998 GM Bill Polian drafted Peyton Manning out of Tennessee helping to turn the franchise around. Since drafting Manning the Colts have made the playoffs in 10 of 12 years and won Super Bowl XLI against the Chicago Bears in 2006, 29–17. Lucas Oil Stadium opened before the 2008 season, replacing the RCA Dome, as the new home of the Colts.

Indiana Pacers (NBA) 

The Indiana Pacers are a professional basketball team based in Indianapolis. The team is part of Central Division in National Basketball Association (NBA). The Pacers began play in the ABA in 1967 and won 3 ABA Championships. In 1976 the Pacers received an invitation to join the National Basketball Association. In the 1987 NBA draft the Pacers selected Reggie Miller out of UCLA. Miller helped the team to make the playoffs 14 out of 17 seasons. To start the 1998–99 NBA season they opened their new arena, Conseco Fieldhouse, now Gainbridge Fieldhouse, after playing at Market Square Arena for 25 years. The Pacers reached their first and only NBA Finals in that same season but lost to the Lakers in 6 games. During the 2004–2005 season the Pacers–Pistons brawl took place in Detroit and the team has struggled with their off the court image with numerous incidents. Reggie Miller retired the same season. Since then the Pacers missed the playoffs in 2007, the first time since 1997 and for only the second time in 22 years.

Minor League teams in Indianapolis

Indiana Fever (WNBA) 
The Indiana Fever are a professional women's basketball team based in Indianapolis. The team is part of the Women's National Basketball Association (WNBA). The Fever were one of the 2000 expansion teams. The WNBA awarded Indianapolis a team with the opening of Conseco Fieldhouse, now Gainbridge Fieldhouse. The Fever won their 1st game in Miami, against the Miami Sol, on national TV but finished the 2000 season in last place at 9–23 and received the 3rd overall pick in the 2001 WNBA draft. In the draft the Fever selected Tennessee superstar Tamika Catchings, although she was forced to sit out the 2001 season with a knee injury. Catchings won the 2002 WNBA Rookie of the Year and has led the Fever in points, rebounds, assists, and steals each season since. They first made the playoffs in 2002 but lost to the New York Liberty in 3 games. Since 2005 the Fever have posted four 21+ win seasons and made it to the Eastern Conference Finals three times. They reached the WNBA Finals for the first time in 2009, losing to the Phoenix Mercury three games to two. The Fever reached the WNBA Finals for the second time in 2012, and the team defeated the Minnesota Lynx three games to one to win their first WNBA Title.

Indianapolis Indians

The Indianapolis Indians are a minor league baseball team based in Indianapolis. The team, which plays in the International League, is the AAA affiliate of the Pittsburgh Pirates. The Indians play at Victory Field, located in downtown Indianapolis.

Founded in 1902, the Indianapolis Indians are the second-oldest minor league franchise in professional sports, behind only the Rochester Red Wings.

In 1985, a group of local investors formed Indianapolis Baseball, Inc. to pursue a Major League Baseball team. The announcement was met with great fanfare; 12,000 season tickets were sold in anticipation of the new team, to be named the Indianapolis Arrows. The initiative was ultimately unsuccessful and season ticket holders were refunded by the end of the year.

Indy Eleven
Indy Eleven is a second-tier soccer team formed in 2013 and plays at the IU Michael A. Carroll Track & Soccer Stadium in Indianapolis. The team competed in the North American Soccer League from 2014 to 2017. They won their first honor during the 2016 season, capturing the Spring Season Championship with an undefeated record. They almost were the NASL Champions, barely losing to the New York Cosmos 4–2 in a penalty shoot-out (0–0 after 90 minutes) during Soccer Bowl 2016. They made a bid in 2017 to join top-tier Major League Soccer as a 2020 expansion team but were passed over at that time. In 2018, the Eleven joined the USL Championship, the second highest division.

Indy Fuel
The Indy Fuel is a minor league ice hockey team in the ECHL, the third tier of professional hockey in North America. The franchise was founded in 2013 and has been affiliated with the NHL's Chicago Blackhawks since the Fuel's foundation.

Top Tier Amateur teams in Indianapolis

Collegiate sports
Indianapolis has three universities that field teams in the NCAA, Butler University (Butler Bulldogs) and Indiana University-Purdue University Indianapolis (IUPUI Jaguars) in Division 1 and the University of Indianapolis in Division 2. Butler is a member of the Big East Conference and IUPUI is a member of Horizon League. The Marian University Knights compete in the NAIA.

Motorsports

Indianapolis Motor Speedway hosts one of the most famous and prestigious auto races, the Indianapolis 500. It is the world's most attended single-day sporting event. Also during May before the Indianapolis 500 the Speedway also uses the road course to run the 
IndyCar Grand Prix. Both races are a part of the IndyCar Series. The Speedway also hosts NASCAR's Brickyard 400, and a round of the Red Bull Air Race. It has also previously hosted rounds on the Formula 1 and Moto GP calendars with, United States Grand Prix from 2000 to 2007, and Red Bull Indianapolis GP from 2008 to 2015 respectively.

Indianapolis is also the central base of many successful IndyCar racing teams. These include Andretti Autosport, Chip Ganassi Racing, Ed Carpenter Racing, and Schmidt Peterson Motorsports.

Events hosted

Indianapolis has gained a reputation within the last thirty years for being a strong city for hosting major sporting events.  While racing has been a major focus of the city for more than one hundred years, different sports, such as swimming and basketball, have become major focal points of the Indianapolis sports hosting landscape.

NCAA Championships
Indianapolis has a special connection with college sports, as it is the headquarters of the NCAA and the home of the NCAA Hall of Fame.  It has also hosted a wide variety of Division I NCAA national championship Events.

Indianapolis has hosted the Men's and Women's NCAA Final Fours, as well as other rounds of the NCAA basketball tournament, several times. Currently, Indianapolis has hosted the second most Men's Final Fours hosted, with eight.  Indianapolis is scheduled to host its ninth Final Four in 2026.  Kansas City currently has the most with ten.  Indianapolis is currently tied for hosting the most Women's Final Fours, with New Orleans and Tampa Bay.

 Men's Basketball

Women's Basketball

Fencing

Rowing

Men's Swimming and Diving

The Indiana University Natatorium has hosted 13 individual Olympic Trials. Eighteen individual swimming world records have been broken at the Natatorium, with swimmers such as Michael Phelps and Ryan Lochte having made multiple appearances at the facility. Most recently, the Natatorium hosted the 2017 NCAA Division I Men's Swimming and Diving Championships where several American and US Open records were broken.

Women's Swimming and Diving

Indoor Track and Field

Outdoor Track and Field

Women's Volleyball

Men's Water Polo

Women's Water Polo

College Football Playoff

On November 1, 2017, it was announced that Indianapolis would host the 2022 College Football Playoff Championship Game at Lucas Oil Stadium, which will serve as the conclusion to the 2021 football season.  This is the first time Indianapolis has hosted any iteration of the college football championship.  It is also the first time that a college football national championship game will be held outside of the South or West.

Big Ten Basketball tournament
Conseco Fieldhouse will host the Big Ten men's tournament for five straight years starting in 2008 after it won the Big Ten bid over Chicago and the United Center. Indianapolis has also hosted the Big Ten women's tournament every year except 2001 since it started in 1995.

Horizon League Basketball tournament
Indianapolis became an irregular home of the Horizon League men's basketball tournament, as Butler commonly was the first overall seed, thus making Hinkle Fieldhouse a common host for the semifinals and finals.  Starting in 2020, Indiana Farmers Coliseum became the contractual home of the tournament.

Big Ten Football Championship Game
In 2011, following the reorganization of the Big Ten Conference into two divisions and the creation of the Big Ten Football Championship Game, Indianapolis was selected to indefinitely host the event in Lucas Oil Stadium.  The game is the culmination of the Big Ten football season, in which the East and West Division champions meet to determine who gets an automatic New Year's Six Bowl berth, typically being the Rose Bowl.  However, due to the high level of play in the conference, a College Football Playoff berth is often on the line.

Indianapolis Tennis Championships
From 1988 to 2009, Indianapolis hosted a lower level tennis tournament, being classified as an ATP World Tour 250 series event.  It was held at the now demolished Indianapolis Tennis Center, which was located on the campus of Indiana University – Purdue University Indianapolis (IUPUI).  Except for its first year, which featured clay courts, every edition of the tournament was played on hard court as an early lead-up event to the U.S. Open.  Despite it being a lesser points event, it commonly attracted major players, such as Grand Slam champions Boris Becker, Patrick Rafter, John McEnroe, Andy Roddick, and Pete Sampras.  Pete Sampras won the event three times, which is the most of any men's single player.

Motorsports
Indianapolis has its original roots in hosting large events in the Indianapolis 500, held at the Indianapolis Motor Speedway.  Started in 1911, it quickly became among the most prestigious and famous races in the world.  It remains the crown jewel of the IndyCar series.  The Indianapolis Motor Speedway has since added several other events, including NASCAR's Brickyard 400, IndyCar's IndyCar Grand Prix, and the Red Bull Air Race of Indianapolis.  The Lucas Oil Raceway, formerly O'Reilly Raceway Park, has also been home to various racing events, most notably the NHRA U.S. Nationals, widely considered the most prestigious drag racing event in the world.

Car Racing

Motorcycle Racing

Aircraft Racing

Super Bowl
Lucas Oil Stadium and the city of Indianapolis made a bid to host Super Bowl XLV in 2011 but lost to Dallas and Cowboys Stadium by only two NFL Owner votes. However, the city made another bid to host Super Bowl XLVI and managed to beat out Houston, Texas and Phoenix for the rights to host the Super Bowl.  Super Bowl XLVI is widely considered to have been hosted extremely well.  NFL Commissioner Roger Goodell suggested that Indianapolis may be a contender for future Super Bowls.

NFL Combine
A few years after the Colts relocated and made Indianapolis its new home, their stadium was utilized for the NFL Combine, a week-long showcase for college football players hoping to get drafted into the NFL.  From 1987 to 2008, the events were held as the RCA Dome.  Starting in 2009, the NFL Combine moved to the new Lucas Oil Stadium.  Coaches, general managers, and other front office management members from all 32 teams report to the city in February to assess young players.  This is the largest single opportunity for the teams to evaluate potential draftees before the NFL Draft in April.

All-Star Games
Indianapolis has hosted several all-star games of various leagues.  They hosted the ABA all-star game twice, the NBA game once, and the Triple-A all star game once.  Indianapolis is currently scheduled to host the NBA All-Star Game again in 2021.

ABA All-Star Game

NBA All-Star Game

Triple-A All-Star Game

ECHL All-Star Game

ABA and NBA Finals
In both the ABA and NBA, the championship series is hosted by the two teams that have advanced to the round, as opposed to the event being awarded prior to the teams being determined, like the Super Bowl.  The Indiana Pacers have brought a championship series to Indianapolis multiple times in their history.  While still playing in the ABA, from 1968 through 1976, Indianapolis were a partial host of the ABA Finals five times.  The Pepsi Coliseum hosted the first four, in 1969, 1970, 1972, and 1973.  Madison Square Garden was the Pacers' home for 1975, which would be their last appearance in the ABA Finals.  Overall, Indianapolis hosted 13 ABA Finals games, more than any other city.  Despite the high level of success of the Pacers during this era and the high number of games, the championship series never ended in Indianapolis, instead always being closed at the alternative team's arena.  Following the absorption of the ABA into the more established NBA, the Pacers began competing for the NBA Championship.  Indianapolis has only hosted one NBA Finals, in 2000.  This time, the games were played in Conseco Fieldhouse, the new home of the Pacers.  The city hosted games 3, 4, and 5, with the Pacers winning the first and last of those games while losing the middle.  Fittingly, the series was closed out in the other city, Los Angeles.

ABA Finals

NBA Finals

WNBA Finals
In the same style as the NBA, the WNBA Finals are only hosted by Indianapolis when the local team, the Fever, make it to the championship round.  This has occurred three times, in 2009, 2012, and 2015.  Conseco Fieldhouse has been home to all of these events, hosting a total of six games.  In each Finals, they have hosted games 3 and 4.  In 2012, the Fever won the championship in game 4 of the WNBA Finals, making it the first, and to date only, professional basketball championship to be clinched in Indianapolis.

Bold denotes a team that clinched the WNBA Championship with the conclusion of the game.

Pan American Games
Indianapolis also hosted the Pan American Games in 1987. Over 4,000 athletes from 38 nations participated in 30 sports at these games.

FIBA World Championships
Indianapolis hosted sixteen international basketball teams at the 2002 FIBA World Championship, which went from August 29 to September 8, 2002.  This was the fourteenth edition of the event.  It was the first, and to date only, time that the United States has hosted the event.  The tournament consisted of 62 games.  25 games were held in the RCA Dome, while Conseco Fieldhouse hosted 37 games, including the championship game.  The tournament culminated with the now defunct Yugoslavia national team winning the title, their second consecutive.  Dirk Nowitzki of the German team was named the tournament MVP.  Ironically, the American team, led by head coach George Karl, had their worst showing at the FIBA World Championships, finishing with a 6–3 record and a sixth-place overall finish.

Golf
Indianapolis has played host to many major golf tournaments. Crooked Stick Golf Club, located in the Indianapolis suburb of Carmel, Indiana, has hosted several events, most notably the 1991 PGA Championship. Other events include the 1993 U.S. Women's Open and the BMW Championship in 2012 and 2016. The Brickyard Crossing Course, partially contained within the Indianapolis Motor Speedway, hosted a Champions Tour event from 1994 to 2000, and will host an LPGA event starting in 2017.

Mini-Marathon
Since 1977, Indianapolis has hosted a mini-marathon during the month of May, usually the first weekend of the month.  It serves as a lead-up event for the Indianapolis 500.  The event, currently called the OneAmerica 500 Festival Mini-Marathon, is the largest mini-marathon in America, and the seventh largest running event in the country.  It is known for selling out the entire field on a regular basis, having sold out every spot since 2001. 
The 13.1 mile course starts in downtown Indianapolis, includes a lap around the Indianapolis Motor Speedway, and then ends with a return to downtown Indianapolis.  Gary Romesser currently has the most wins at the event, having won the race in 1983, 1984, 1985, 1988, and 1991.

Amateur sports

Indianapolis teams
The Indianapolis Tornados are a Men's AAA minor league football team of the Premier Amateur Football League-Tier 1
The Indiana Speed are a women's football team of Women's Football Alliance.
The F. C. Indiana (NPSL) are a soccer team of the National Premier Soccer League.
The Indianapolis Braves are a soccer team of the National Premier Soccer League.
The F. C. Indiana (WPSL) are a soccer team of the WPSL Elite League.
The Indianapolis Impalas are a Division 1 rugby team of USA Rugby.
The Indiana Ice are an ice hockey team that is a member of the United States Hockey League, but is considered on hiatus.
The Indy Eleven Women are a soccer team set to begin play in the USL W League inaugural season.

Ice hockey
The Indiana Ice played in the United States Hockey League, an amateur junior ice hockey league for players age 20 and younger. They played the majority of their home games at the Fairgrounds Coliseum, located in the Indiana State Fairgrounds in Indianapolis before going dormant after the 2013–14 season. Some of its home games were also played at Conseco Fieldhouse. The president of the Ice is Paul Skjodt. The Ice filled a hockey void left by the Indianapolis Ice franchise that existed from 1988 to 2004 when they relocated to Topeka.

Cricket
Cricket is a street-level sport among the South Asian communities that live in Indianapolis. Indianapolis mayor Greg Ballard identified the international appeal of cricket after his trip to South Africa, where he watched an Indian Premier League game that had been relocated to South Africa due to terrorist tensions in India during 2009 season. He initiated construction of the Indianapolis World Sports Park and its cricket stadium to make the city a global venue for cricket games. Cricket is a popular sport among Indian and South Asian communities and Ballard said that the city has a large enough South Asian community to start a cricket village. The plans for the stadium were started in 2009. Indianapolis has one club, Cricket Club of Indianapolis, that is registered with USACA. Multiple local amateur teams play with tennis balls in central Indiana, including ones in Bloomington, Carmel, Columbus, Fishers, Fort Wayne, Kokomo, West Lafayette, and also downtown at the IUPUI campus. Indiana (Youth) cricket (INYCA) with USYCA FREE cricket equipment and education program is expanding youth and school cricket in Indiana schools and colleges. Jatin Patel of USYCA and founder of the USA Center for Excellence in Cricket introduced the nation's first cricket coaching certification program for physical education teachers in Indiana schools during 2012. INYCA is targeting a future inter-school cricket tournament. The Indianapolis World Sports Park cricket ground is the home of the ICC Americas Cricket Combine – team to play in the WICB's Nagico Super50 and 2015 ICC Americas Twenty20 Division One.

Hurling
Hurling is a summer sport played among Irish communities in Indianapolis. Indianapolis Gaelic Athletic Association, formerly Indy Hurling Club, has been playing hurling in Indianapolis since 2002, and began competing on a national level in 2007. Indy GAA plays a summer co-ed hurling league, but also fields a team to compete in Gaelic Football and Camogie (female hurling) at the NACB Championships every Labor Day weekend. Indy GAA has several national championships, and is sponsored by local businesses around the city.

Little League baseball and softball
Little League, founded in 1939 in Williamsport, Pennsylvania, opened its Central Region Headquarters in Indianapolis in 1989. Since 2011, the Little League Central Region Headquarters has hosted tournaments for the 11–12 age group to determine the Central Region representatives for the Little League Baseball World Series in Williamsport and the Little League Softball World Series in Portland, Oregon. The Reuben F. Glick Little League Center is located on 9802 E. Little League Drive in Indianapolis and provides operation support to the 13 states located within the Central Region.

Defunct teams
 
Indianapolis ABCs
Indianapolis Athletics
Indiana Blast
Indiana Blaze
Indianapolis Blues
Indianapolis Capitals
Indianapolis Capitols
Indianapolis Checkers
Indianapolis Chiefs
Indianapolis Clowns
Indianapolis Daredevils
Indiana Firebirds
Indianapolis Hoosiers (American Association)
Indianapolis Hoosiers (National League)
Indianapolis Hoosiers (Federal League)
Indianapolis Ice
Indianapolis Jets
Indianapolis Olympians
Indianapolis Racers
Indiana Speed (WFA)
Indiana Twisters

See also
Sport in Indiana
List of baseball parks in Indianapolis

References